"Come Live with Me Angel" (sometimes written "Come Live with Me, Angel") is a smooth soul song recorded by soul singer Marvin Gaye. The song was co-written by singer-songwriter Leon Ware, lyricist Jacqueline Dalya-Hilliard and Gaye himself (uncredited). The song is the second track on Gaye's album I Want You.

Background
Ware recorded the song with singer Minnie Riperton with plans to release it as a single and include it in his second album, tentatively titled after the original name of the song, which was called "Comfort". The album would later be titled Musical Massage. 

One day, at Gaye's house, Gaye was in a room listening to music, and Ware was in a different room playing an unreleased record on his cassette tape that had three duets Ware did with Riperton. Gaye reportedly heard it through the wall and came to Ware and asked him, "What is that you’re playing?" “It’s my new album," Ware replied. Subsequently, Ware invited Gaye to listen to the record, and soon enough, the inspired Gaye convinced Ware to give him the songs for his upcoming album, promising that he would "do the whole thing," and willingly agreed. One of the songs they had listened to was the original version of "Come Live With Me, Angel".

Composition and lyrics
The song is in the key of B minor. The influences of the song derived from jazz and R&B/Soul, which was Ware's usual songwriting style.

Gaye's rendition features slightly altered lyrics from Ware's original version. 

In Gaye's version, "Come Live With Me, Angel" finds Gaye serenading "Papa's lil' sweet angel," promising to understand her moods while pleading her to live with him and offers her sex "Three times a day/In all the ways, baby."

Recording
The basic track of the song was recorded for Ware, with him present in Sunset Room at Motown Recording Studios on May 23, 1975.

Overdubbing sessions for the rest of the instrumentation and vocals took place on June 12, July 1, and July 3, 1975.

Gaye overdubbed his vocals at Marvin's Room on January 30 and February 4, 1976, replacing Ware's and Riperton's harmony vocals.

Releases
The song first appeared on Gaye's I Want You album, released on March 16, 1976.

In 1995, a re-recorded version of the song by Ware was featured on his seventh album Taste The Love as the album's opening track.

In 2001, UK label Expansion Records made Ware's Musical Massage album available on CD for the first time. The CD included previously unreleased tracks, including the original version of "Come Live With Me, Angel". Motown then followed suit by releasing their own pressing of the album in 2003. Motown issued a Deluxe Edition of Gaye's I Want You album in the same year, which included an unedited mix of the song that features a missing bridge section and several choruses of the trumpet solo played by Chuck Findley.

Motown never issued Gaye's version of the song as a single in Gaye's lifetime, but in 2016, Universal Music Japan and Captain Vinyl released "Come Live With Me, Angel" alongside Meli'sa Morgan's original version of "Fool's Paradise" on 7-inch vinyl exclusively to the Japanese market.

Cover versions
In 1994, South African singer Audrey Motaung covered "Come Live With Me, Angel" on her album Colours Can't Clash.

In 2003, Hip hop/Rap group G-Unit sampled "Come Live With Me, Angel" on their song "Wanna Get to Know You" from their album Beg for Mercy.

In 2012, American musician Mndsgn sampled "Come Live With Me, Angel" on his song "Yahlubba(nu)" from his album Feels.

Personnel
Gaye's version, personnel per David Ritz and Harry Weinger.

 Lead and background vocals by Marvin Gaye
 Moaning and sighing vocals by Gwanda Hambrick
 Instrumentation by various studio musicians, some of which include, drummer James Gadson, bassist Chuck Rainey, guitarist David T. Walker and trumpeter Chuck Findley
 Orchestral arrangements by Coleridge-Taylor Perkinson
 Rhythm arrangements by Leon Ware
 Produced by Leon Ware, Hal Davis, Marvin Gaye and Berry Gordy, Jr.
 Recording engineering by Art Stewart and Fred Ross

References

Bibliography
Richard Torres (2003). Romantic Obsession. I Want You. Deluxe edition liner notes. UMG Recordings, Inc.

Harry Weinger (2003). Romantic Obsession sidebars. "The Dance". I Want You. Deluxe edition liner notes. UMG Recordings, Inc.

David Ritz (2003). I Want You. Deluxe edition liner notes. UMG Recordings, Inc.

External links

 "Come Live With Me Angel "on Discogs
 "Comfort" on Discogs

Marvin Gaye songs
Songs written by Leon Ware
1976 songs
Soul songs
Jazz-funk songs